Megallium is a trademark for an alloy of 60% cobalt, 20% chromium, 5% molybdenum, and traces of other substances.  The alloy is used in dentistry because of its light weight, resistance to corrosion and hypo-allergenic (nickel free) properties. Megallium was developed by John Leonard Attenborough for Attenborough Dental Laboratories in 1951.

External links
History from attenborough.com
Dental Applications from attenborough.com
Dental Samples from attenborough.com
Dental Techniques from attenborough.com

Cobalt alloys
Dental materials
Chromium alloys